Alittus is a genus of leaf beetles in the subfamily Eumolpinae. It is known from Australia.

Species
 Alittus carinatus (Blackburn, 1889)
 Alittus flavolineatus Lea, 1922
 Alittus foveolatus Chapuis, 1874
 Alittus macleayi Lea, 1915
 Alittus micans (Blackburn, 1889)
 Alittus politus (Blackburn, 1889)
 Alittus rugipennis Lea, 1915
 Alittus scutellaris Lea, 1915

References

External links
 Genus Alittus Chapuis, 1874 at Australian Faunal Directory

Eumolpinae
Chrysomelidae genera
Beetles of Australia
Taxa named by Félicien Chapuis